Speaker of the Dead is the fourth studio album by metalcore/nu metal band Emmure released on February 15, 2011. The record was produced by Joey Sturgis, who also produced the following full-length. Speaker of the Dead is Emmure's fourth studio release under Victory Records, completing Victory's four-album deal at the time. However, Emmure re-signed with Victory and released two later albums, Slave to the Game on April 10, 2012, and Eternal Enemies on April 15, 2014.

Background
On January 7, 2011, Victory Records released a 41-second teaser on YouTube which displayed the album's official artwork, as well as giving a preview of "Children of Cybertron", the intro track off of the album. On January 18, 2011, the first single, "Demons with Ryu", was released on iTunes and Amazon MP3. On February 9, 2011, a music video was made and released for the song "Solar Flare Homicide". At the release, Speaker of the Dead debuted at No. 68 on the Billboard 200, No. 18 on the Rock Albums chart, No. 4 on the Hard Rock Albums chart, and No. 11 on the Independent Albums chart. All the drums on Speaker of the Dead were programmed.

Reception

Speaker of the Dead received mixed reviews from critics. Peter Gorgui of ReviewRinseRepeat.com wrote a negative review of the album calling Speaker of the Dead a "failure" and describing the album's content as "boring" and "desperate". Gorgui did, however, praise the production done on the album by Joey Sturgis, saying Sturgis gave the album "a crunchy and crisp sound."

Track listing

Personnel
Emmure
 Frankie Palmeri - vocals
 Jesse Ketive - lead guitar
 Mike Mulholland - rhythm guitar
 Mark Davis - bass guitar

Production
 Produced, engineered, mixed, mastered and programmed drums by Joey Sturgis
Edited vocals by Nick Sampson
Produced vocals by Taylor Voeltz
Artwork and layout by We Are Synapse

References

2011 albums
Emmure albums
Victory Records albums
Albums produced by Joey Sturgis